The 2020–21 CSA 3-Day Provincial Cup was a first-class cricket competition that took place in South Africa during February and March 2021. Easterns and KwaZulu-Natal were the defending champions, after the title was shared due to the COVID-19 pandemic. 

The first matches were scheduled to start on 7 January 2021, however the start of the season was delayed until February due to the pandemic. Initially the tournament was to be played between the fifteen South African provincial teams, split into two groups. However, after the tournament restarted in February 2021, Cricket South Africa (CSA) confirmed that the South Africa under-19 cricket team would also be included in the competition. CSA issued a revised schedule for the tournament, with all the matches being held in a bio-secure environment. Matches involving either Limpopo, Mpumalanga or the South Africa under-19 team did not have first-class status.

In March 2021, Border were dismissed for just sixteen runs in their second innings, equalling the lowest team total in first-class cricket in South Africa. In the South Africa under-19's first match, the team were bowled out for 41 runs in their first innings, before going on to lose the match by an innings and 83 runs.

Teams
The teams were placed into the following groups:

 Pool A: Boland, Border, KwaZulu-Natal, South Western Districts
 Pool B: Easterns, Free State, KwaZulu-Natal Inland, Limpopo
 Pool C: Northerns, Northern Cape, South Africa Under-19s, Western Province
 Pool D: Eastern Province, Gauteng, Mpumalanga, North West

Fixtures

Pool A

Pool B

Pool C

Pool D

Notes

References

External links
 Series home at ESPN Cricinfo

South African domestic cricket competitions
CSA 3-Day Provincial Cup
2020–21 South African cricket season
CSA 3-Day Provincial Cup